Tejalapan Zapotec (Zapoteco de Tejalápam) is a nearly extinct Zapotecan language of the Mexican state of Oaxaca (San Felipe Tejalapam). It may be closest to the otherwise divergent Mazaltepec Zapotec.

References 

Zapotec languages
Endangered Oto-Manguean languages
Endangered indigenous languages of the Americas

Languages of Mexico